Timmins/Porcupine Lake Water Aerodrome, formerly , was a water aerodrome located adjacent to Timmins, Ontario, Canada on Porcupine Lake.

Tenants
The aerodrome's only tenant was Ratcliff Aircraft Limited (serviced float planes since 1985). The company owned the hangar and parking facilities.

A wooden ramp allowed floatplanes to dock and passengers to disembark. Additional floatplanes were stored on the grass next to the dock.

On December 7, 2015, a fire destroyed the hangar, along with several aircraft and equipment in the facility for winter storage.

Transportation
The aerodrome was located on Lakeview Drive between Bruce and Golden Avenues.

See also
 Timmins/Victor M. Power Airport

References

Transport in Timmins
Airports in Cochrane District
Defunct seaplane bases in Ontario